Agriculture Hall may refer to:

Agriculture Hall (Tippecanoe County, Indiana), listed on the Indiana Register of Historic Sites and Structures
Agriculture Hall (Ames, Iowa), listed on the National Register of Historic Places in Story County, Iowa
Melligan Store-Agriculture Hall, Port Hope, Michigan, listed on the National Register of Historic Places in Huron County, Michigan
Agriculture Hall (Madison, Wisconsin), listed on the National Register of Historic Places in Dane County, Wisconsin

Architectural disambiguation pages